Ana Sagar Lake is an artificial lake situated in the city of Ajmer in Rajasthan state in India. It was built by Arnoraja (alias Ana), the grandfather of Prithviraj Chauhan, in 1135 -1150 AD and is named after him. The catchments were built with the help of local populace.

History
Mughal Emperor Jahangir constructed Daulat Bagh garden beside the lake. Shah Jahan constructed five pavilions (known as Baradari) between the garden and the lake.

Details

There is a Circuit house on a hill near the lake that used to be British Residency. This is one of the main tourist attraction there. There is an island in the center of the lake which is accessible by boat. Boats could be hired from the east side of the Daulat Bagh. There are Chowpatty and Jetty walkway next to each other and Baradari to capture the scenic of the lake. The lake is the biggest one in Ajmer, with the maximum catchments area ( built up area). The Rajasthan High Court has banned construction in the catchment areas of the lake basins.

Rishi Udyan

Dayananda Saraswati, who breathed his last at Bhinai Kothi near Ajmer, his ashes were scattered at Ajmer in Rishi Udyan as per his wishes, which is located on the bank of the Ana Sagar Lake and makes an excellent sunset point. Rishi Udyan has a functional Arya Samaj temple with daily morning and evening yajna homa, where an annual 3 day Aruasamaj melā is held every year on Rishi Dayanand's death anniversary at the end of October, which also entails vedic seminars, vedas memorisation competition, yajna, and Dhavaja Rohan flag march. It is organised by the Paropkarini Sabha, which was founded by Swami Dayanand Saraswati on 16 August 1880 in Meerut, registered in Ajmer on 27 February 1883, and since 1893 has been operating from its office in Ajmer.

Gallery

See also
 List of lakes in India

References

External links 

rajasthantourism.gov.in

Lakes of Rajasthan
Tourist attractions in Ajmer
Artificial lakes of India
Wetlands of India
Hindu pilgrimage sites 
Arya Samaj
Water Heritage Sites in India